Ride the Fader is the second and last studio album by American indie rock band Chavez. It was released on Matador Records on November 5, 1996.  The album is considered by most fans and critics to be the band's best work.

Critical reception
Andrew Earles, in Gimme Indie Rock: 500 Essential American Underground Rock Albums 1981-1996, wrote that "Chavez's second album in a gigantic wall of all-encompassing guitar wizardry (riffs, leads, and everything else) constructed over a massive rhythm section and majestic vocals." Entertainment Weekly praised the album as "a fine specimen of spare, brainy post-metal hard rock."

Track listing
"Top Pocket Man" - 2:58
"The Guard Attacks" - 2:58
"Unreal Is Here" - 2:32
"New Room - 3:11
"Tight Around the Jaws" - 3:22
"Lions" - 2:40
"Our Boys Will Shine Tonight" - 3:29
"Memorize This Face" - 1:45
"Cold Joys" - 2:37
"Flight '96" - 5:30
"Ever Overpsyched" - 2:29
"You Must Be Stopped" - 4:43

Personnel
The James Lo - drums
Scott Marshall - bass
Matt Sweeney - vocals, guitar
Clay Tarver - guitar
Bryce Goggin - co-producer
John Agnello - co-producer

References

Chavez (band) albums
1996 albums